Piravom Road railway station (code: PVRD) is a railway station in Kottayam district, Kerala and falls under the Thiruvananthapuram railway division of the Southern Railway zone, Indian Railways. It is located in the village of Velloor.

See also 
 Ernakulam–Kottayam–Kayamkulam line
 Kottayam railway station
 Tiruvalla railway station
 Changanasseri railway station
 Kayamkulam Junction railway station
 Ernakulam Town railway station
 Ernakulam Junction railway station
 Thiruvananthapuram railway division

Railway stations in Kottayam district
Railway stations opened in 1904